Calvin R. "Cal" Musselman is an American politician and real estate broker serving as a member of the Utah House of Representatives from the 9th district. Elected in 2018, he assumed office on January 2, 2019.

Early life and education 
Musselman was born in Salt Lake City and raised in Monticello, Utah. His father was a diesel mechanic and his mother was a school cafeteria cook. He earned an Associate of Science degree in general science from Dixie State University and studied geology at the University of Utah in 1990 and 1991.

Career 
Musselman served in the United States Army during the Gulf War. Since 1999, he has worked as an associate real estate broker at Golden Spike Realty in Ogden, Utah. He was elected to the Utah House of Representatives in 2018 and assumed office on January 2, 2019.

Personal life 
Musselman and his wife live in West Haven, Utah. They previously lived in Ogden and Roy, Utah.

References 

Living people
People from Salt Lake City
Politicians from Salt Lake City
People from Monticello, Utah
People from Ogden, Utah
People from Weber County, Utah
Utah Tech University alumni
Republican Party members of the Utah House of Representatives
21st-century American politicians
United States Army personnel of the Gulf War
Year of birth missing (living people)